Alcithoe is a genus of large sea snails, marine gastropod molluscs in the family Volutidae, the volutes.

Description
Alcithoe are large, benthic neogastropod marine snails. Species are predators, and all taxa undergo direct development.

Distribution
Alcithoe species are found in seas surrounding New Zealand. There is a rich fossil record for the genus.

Species
Species within the genus Alcithoe include:

 Alcithoe aillaudorum(Ph. Bouchet & G. T. Poppe, 1988)
 Alcithoe albescens Bail & Limpus, 2005
 Alcithoe arabica (Gmelin, 1791)
 † Alcithoe arabicula Marwick, 1926
 † Alcithoe bacchanalia L. C. King, 1934
 † Alcithoe bartrumi L. C. King, 1933
 †  Alcithoe bathgatei Finlay, 1926
 Alcithoe benthicola (Dell, 1963)
 † Alcithoe brevis Marwick, 1926
 † Alcithoe bulbus (Marwick, 1931)
 † Alcithoe callaghani (L. C. King, 1931)
 Alcithoe colesae Bail & Limpus, 2005
 † Alcithoe concisa Marwick, 1931
 † Alcithoe cylindrica Marwick, 1926
 Alcithoe davegibbsi (Hart, 1999)
 † Alcithoe dilatata Marwick, 1926
 † Alcithoe dyscrita Finlay, 1926
 † Alcithoe exigua Marwick, 1926
 † Alcithoe familiaris Marwick, 1926
 † Alcithoe finlayi Marwick, 1926
 † Alcithoe firma (Marwick, 1926)
 Alcithoe fissurata (Dell, 1963)
 Alcithoe flemingi Dell, 1978 photo
 Alcithoe fusus (Quoy & Gaimard, 1833)
 † Alcithoe gatesi Marwick, 1926
 Alcithoe grahami (Powell, 1965)
 † Alcithoe gravicostata L. C. King, 1931
 Alcithoe haurakiensis Dell, 1956
  † Alcithoe haweraensis Marwick, 1926
 Alcithoe hedleyi (Murdoch & Suter, 1906)
 † Alcithoe hurupiensis Marwick, 1926
 † Alcithoe irregularis Marwick, 1926
 Alcithoe jaculoides Powell, 1924 - synonym: Alcithoe calva Powell, 1928
 Alcithoe larochei Marwick, 1926
 † Alcithoe lepida Marwick, 1926
 Alcithoe lutea (Watson, 1882)
 † Alcithoe marlburiana L. C. King, 1934
 † Alcithoe murdochi (Marwick, 1926)
 † Alcithoe nodulifera Laws, 1935
 Alcithoe pacifica 
 † Alcithoe parva Marwick, 1926
 † Alcithoe phymatias Finlay, 1926
 † Alcithoe pinguella (Marwick, 1931)
 † Alcithoe powelli (Laws, 1936)
 Alcithoe pseudolutea Bail & Limpus, 2005
 † Alcithoe regularis Finlay, 1926
 † Alcithoe renwicki (Marwick, 1928)
 † Alcithoe resolutionis C. A. Fleming, 1954
 † Alcithoe rugosa (Marwick, 1926)
 † Alcithoe scitula Marwick, 1926
 † Alcithoe scopi Marwick, 1926
 Alcithoe seelyeorum Bail & Limpus, 2005
 Alcithoe smithi (Powell, 1950) 
 † Alcithoe solida Marwick, 1926
 Alcithoe tigrina Bail & Limpus, 2005
 Alcithoe triregensis Bail & Limpus, 2005
 † Alcithoe turrita (Suter, 1917)
 † Alcithoe uptonensis L. C. King, 1934
 † Alcithoe whakinoensis Marwick, 1926
 Alcithoe wilsonae (Powell, 1933)

Species brought into synonymy
 Alcithoe calva Powell, 1928: synonym of Alcithoe jaculoides Powell, 1924
 Alcithoe chathamensis (Dell, 1956): synonym of Alcithoe wilsonae (Powell, 1933)
 Alcithoe johnstoni Powell, 1928: synonym of Alcithoe jaculoides Powell, 1924
 Alcithoe knoxi (Dell, 1956): synonym of Alcithoe wilsonae (Powell, 1933)
 Alcithoe motutaraensis Powell, 1928: synonym of Alcithoe arabica (Gmelin, 1791)
  † Alcithoe oliveri Marwick, 1926: synonym of Mauira oliveri (Marwick, 1926)
 Alcithoe ostenfeldi (Iredale, 1937): synonym of Alcithoe larochei ostenfeldi (Iredale, 1937)
 Alcithoe swainsoni Marwick, 1926: synonym of Alcithoe arabica (Gmelin, 1791)
 Alcithoe swainsoni motutarensis Powell, 1928: synonym of Alcithoe arabica (Gmelin, 1791)

References

External links

 Museum of New Zealand Te Papa Tongarewa, Taxon: Alcithoe (Genus)
 Revised descriptions of New Zealand Cenozoic Mollusca from Beu and Maxwell (1990)
 Checklist of the Recent Mollusca Recorded from the New Zealand Exclusive Economic Zone

Volutidae
Gastropod genera
Taxa named by Arthur Adams (zoologist)
Taxa named by Henry Adams (zoologist)